The Hagdale Chromate Railway was a  narrow-gauge railway on the Isle of Unst, in the Shetland Islands.
Built in 1907, it connected the chromite quarries at Hagdale with a pier at Baltasound.  None of Shetland's few narrow-gauge railways were preserved.

References
 

Railways on Scottish Islands
Pre-grouping British railway companies
Closed railway lines in Scotland
2 ft 6 in gauge railways in Scotland
Railway lines opened in 1907
Transport in Shetland
1907 establishments in Scotland
Unst